The Chaochuan Formation is a geologic formation in China (Zhejiang Province). It is made up of purplish red calcarenaceous, muddy siltstone, fine-grained sandstone with interbeds of tuffaceous sandstone and conglomerate or rhyolitic tuff.

Fossil content 
The following fossils were reported from the formation:
 Dongyangopelta yangyanensis
 Therizinosauridae indet. (once known as "Chilantaisaurus" zheziangensis)
 Zhejiangosaurus lishuiensis

References 

Geologic formations of China
Cretaceous System of Asia
Albian Stage
Cenomanian Stage
Sandstone formations
Siltstone formations
Tuff formations
Lacustrine deposits
Paleontology in Zhejiang